The 2003–04 NBA season was the 16th season for the Miami Heat in the National Basketball Association. This season saw the team draft future All-Star and 3-time NBA Champion Dwyane Wade with the fifth overall pick in the 2003 NBA draft, while acquiring forward Lamar Odom from the Los Angeles Clippers. Before the season began, head coach Pat Riley resigned, but he would later return midway in the 2005–06 season and help guide the Heat to their first ever NBA championship. Under new head coach Stan Van Gundy, the Heat stumbled out of the gate losing their first seven games. By the beginning of March, the team had a record of 25–36. However, the Heat rallied to win 17 of their last 21 games, finishing with a final record of 42–40. Despite the mediocre record, the Heat entered the playoffs as the #4 seed in the Eastern Conference. Wade had a stellar rookie season, averaging 16.2 points per game, and was selected to the All-Rookie First Team.

The first round series pitted the Heat against the New Orleans Hornets, then in its second season of existence. The Heat would go on to defeat New Orleans in seven games. They advanced to the Conference Semi-finals for the first time since 2000. However, they went no further as they fell to the top-seeded Indiana Pacers in six games.

Following the season, Odom, second-year forward Caron Butler, and Brian Grant were all traded to the Los Angeles Lakers for big man Shaquille O'Neal, who had bad blood with Kobe Bryant; Bryant blamed O'Neal for the Lakers' loss in the finals to the underdog Detroit Pistons.

Key dates
 June 26 – The 2003 NBA draft took place in New York City.
 July 8 – The free agency period started.
 October 27 – The Heat's regular season began with a road game versus the Philadelphia 76ers at the Wachovia Center.

Offseason

2003 NBA Draft

Free agency
Signings:

Lamar Odom,
Rafer Alston

Roster

Pre-season

Game log

|- style="background:#cfc;"
| 1
| October 7
| Philadelphia
| 
| N/A
| N/A
| N/A
| Roberto Clemente Coliseum8,893
| 1–0
|- style="background:#cfc;"
| 2
| October 10
| Atlanta
| 
| N/A
| N/A
| N/A
| TECO Arena3,895
| 2–0
|- style="background:#cfc;"
| 3
| October 11
| @ Orlando
| 
| N/A
| N/A
| N/A
| Amway Arena13,118
| 3–0
|- style="background:#cfc;"
| 4
| October 14
| San Antonio
| 
| N/A
| N/A
| N/A
| AmericanAirlines Arena10,019
| 4–0
|- style="background:#fcc;"
| 5
| October 16
| @ Atlanta
| 
| N/A
| N/A
| N/A
| Philips Arena8,193
| 4–1
|- style="background:#cfc;"
| 6
| October 17
| @ Detroit
| 
| N/A
| N/A
| N/A
| The Palace of Auburn Hills19,757
| 5–1
|- style="background:#fcc;"
| 7
| October 21
| Memphis
| 
| N/A
| N/A
| N/A
| AmericanAirlines Arena10,241
| 5–2
|-

Regular season

Standings

Record vs. opponents

Game log

October
Record: 0-3 ; Home: 0-1 ; Road: 0-2

November
Record: 5–9 ; Home: 4–2 ; Road: 1–7

December
Record: 8–7 ; Home: 5–3 ; Road: 3–4

January
Record: 8–8 ; Home: 6–2 ; Road: 2–6

February
Record: 4–8 ; Home: 3–4 ; Road: 1–4

March
Record: 12–3 ; Home: 9–1 ; Road: 3–2

April
Record: 5–2 ; Home: 3–0 ; Road: 2–2

Playoffs

|- align="center" bgcolor="#ccffcc"
| 1
| April 18
| New Orleans
| W 81–79
| Dwyane Wade (21)
| Lamar Odom (11)
| Odom, Wade (5)
| American Airlines Arena20,102
| 1–0
|- align="center" bgcolor="#ccffcc"
| 2
| April 21
| New Orleans
| W 93–63
| Eddie Jones (19)
| Brian Grant (11)
| Dwyane Wade (6)
| American Airlines Arena20,189
| 2–0
|- align="center" bgcolor="#ffcccc"
| 3
| April 24
| @ New Orleans
| L 71–77
| Caron Butler (24)
| Caron Butler (15)
| Caron Butler (4)
| New Orleans Arena14,251
| 2–1
|- align="center" bgcolor="#ffcccc"
| 4
| April 27
| @ New Orleans
| L 85–96
| Lamar Odom (25)
| Brian Grant (9)
| Dwyane Wade (10)
| New Orleans Arena16,009
| 2–2
|- align="center" bgcolor="#ccffcc"
| 5
| April 30
| New Orleans
| W 87–83
| Eddie Jones (25)
| Caron Butler (11)
| Dwyane Wade (5)
| American Airlines Arena20,147
| 3–2
|- align="center" bgcolor="#ffcccc"
| 6
| May 2
| @ New Orleans
| L 83–89
| Dwyane Wade (27)
| Lamar Odom (11)
| Dwyane Wade (6)
| New Orleans Arena17,297
| 3–3
|- align="center" bgcolor="#ccffcc"
| 7
| May 4
| New Orleans
| W 85–77
| Caron Butler (23)
| three players tied (9)
| Dwyane Wade (7)
| American Airlines Arena20,286
| 4–3
|-

|- align="center" bgcolor="#ffcccc"
| 1
| May 6
| @ Indiana
| L 81–94
| Dwyane Wade (22)
| Caron Butler (9)
| Alston, Wade (4)
| Conseco Fieldhouse18,345
| 0–1
|- align="center" bgcolor="#ffcccc"
| 2
| May 8
| @ Indiana
| L 80–91
| Odom, Wade (19)
| Lamar Odom (12)
| Alston, Wade (5)
| Conseco Fieldhouse18,345
| 0–2
|- align="center" bgcolor="#ccffcc"
| 3
| May 10
| Indiana
| W 94–87
| Dwyane Wade (25)
| Brian Grant (16)
| Dwyane Wade (6)
| American Airlines Arena20,115
| 1–2
|- align="center" bgcolor="#ccffcc"
| 4
| May 12
| Indiana
| W 100–88
| Lamar Odom (22)
| Caron Butler (10)
| Dwyane Wade (7)
| American Airlines Arena20,128
| 2–2
|- align="center" bgcolor="#ffcccc"
| 5
| May 15
| @ Indiana
| L 83–94
| Dwyane Wade (16)
| Lamar Odom (10)
| Dwyane Wade (10)
| Conseco Fieldhouse18,345
| 2–3
|- align="center" bgcolor="#ffcccc"
| 6
| May 18
| Indiana
| L 70–73
| Dwyane Wade (24)
| Brian Grant (10)
| three players tied (2)
| American Airlines Arena20,136
| 2–4
|-

Player statistics
Bold designates team leader.

Playoffs
Bold designates team leader.

Awards, records and milestones

Awards

Week/Month

All-Star

Season

Records

Milestones

Injuries and surgeries

Transactions

Trades

Free agents

Additions

Subtractions

References

Miami Heat seasons
Miami Heat
Miami Heat
Miami Heat